HMS Swan was launched on 21 November 1767 at Plymouth as the lead ship of the 24 ships in the 14-gun Swan-class of ship-sloops built in the 1760s and 1770s. She served during the American Revolutionary War and the French Revolutionary War. She bore the name HMS Explosion between 1779 and 1783; at the time she was classed as a fireship. She was laid up in 1801 and finally sold in 1814. Swan then became a whaler in the northern whale fishery, sailing out of Kingston-on-Hull. She also made one voyage to the southern whale fishery (1819–1821) and one merchant voyage to Brazil and Hamburg, before returning to the northern whale fishery. She was broken up circa. 1841.

Royal Navy
December, 1774 under command of Capt. James Ayscough serving in British North America.
Swan took Europe and sent her to Cowes around 17 July 1793.

Whaler
In 1814 Swan became a whaler sailing to the Northern Whale Fishery. She made annual voyages to Greenland or Davis Strait from 1815 to 1819.

Northern Whale Fishery
Swan, Taylor, master, made five annual voyages between 1815 and 1819. The data below is from Coltish.

South Seas Whale Fishery
In 1819–1821 Swan made one voyage to the South Seas Whale Fishery. Captain Dring sailed on 2 November 1819, bound for Walvis Bay. Swan returned to Hull on 28 September 1821 with 170 tons of whale oil. The cargo bounty was £500, and the cargo's value was £3420.

Swan then sailed as a merchantman to Brazil. On 4 March 1822 she was at Falmouth, having come from Hull and on her way to Rio de Janeiro. She arrived at Rio on 30 April. On 23 June she was at Bahia. By 12 September she had returned to Deal and on the 17th she sailed for Hambro. She arrived at Cuxhaven on 25 September, and Hambro the next day. She returned to Hull on 22 November.

Northern Whale Fishery

Swan, Dring, master, returned to the Northern Whale Fishery in 1823. In 1823 and 1824 she did her whale hunting off Greenland. From 1825 to 1840 she was at Davis Strait. The data below is primarily from Coltish.

In 1836 Swan, Robert Dring, master, was the last of the Northern Fishery whalers to sail for the fisheries. In October she became ice-bound (beset) and did not get free until spring of 1837. In 1837 she was at Peterhead on 29 June, having gotten free of the ice on 24 May. Swan was then some 30 miles west of Disco and Captain Stairton's men refused to got to Swans assistance on the grounds that Swan was far off and they weren't paid to do so. She was only able to get free because the crews of five whalers came upon her and sawed 3000 feet of heavy ice to get her out. The vessels also provided provisions, with one, Charlotte, Adamson, master, being particularly helpful. Then Dunscombe, owned by the same company as Swan, left off her fishing, provided 20 men to fill out Swans crew, and accompanied her home. Of Swans crew of 48 men, 20 had died, 14 of them in an attempt to reach a Danish colony in her boats. In addition to the men of her crew who died, five more men also died. Swan had taken on a boat of six men from the wrecked Jane and Mary, of London; of the six, only the mate survived.

On 18 August Swan, Dring, master, sailed from Hull to Petersburg. She returned on 14 November. Such off-season voyages may have been more common than this one instance would suggest.

Fate

Her entry in LR for 1841 and 1842 carried no trade data. Her entry in the 1842 volume bore the annotation "broken up" beneath her name.

Citations and references
Citations

References

External links
 

Swan (1767)
1767 ships
Swan-class ship-sloops
Age of Sail merchant ships of England
Whaling ships